Port Medway is a community in the Canadian province of Nova Scotia, located in the Region of Queens Municipality .

References
 Port Medway on Destination Nova Scotia

Communities in the Region of Queens Municipality
General Service Areas in Nova Scotia